Bilsanda is a town and nagar panchayat in the Pilibhit district of Uttar Pradesh, India.

Geography
It has an average elevation of 161 metres (528 feet).

Demographics
As of the 2001 Census of India, Bilsanda had a population of 13,474. Males constitute 53% of the population and females 47%. Bilsanda has an average literacy rate of 54%, lower than the national average of 59.5%; with male literacy of 60% and female literacy of 47%. 16% of the population is under 6 years of age.

References

Cities and towns in Pilibhit district